"Who's David" is a song by British pop punk band Busted. It was released on 16 February 2004 as the second single from their second studio album, A Present for Everyone (2003). It was co-written by Tom Fletcher, one of the lead vocalists and guitarists from the band McFly. The single features the live version of "Teenage Kicks", which the band performed at the 2004 Brit Awards ceremony. In response to being frequently asked "who is David?", Willis claimed that David is the name of his facial mole.

The song was written about experiences with a girl who is unfaithful. The single peaked at number one on the UK Singles Chart, becoming the group's third number-one single, and their second consecutive. In 2004, "Who's David" came 20th in a VH1 viewer survey of the worst number-one singles of all time.

Music video
The official music video features Busted before they go on stage for a gig. The video begins with the band backstage, followed by thousands of fans piling into the arena. Busted are swamped by paparazzi as they go towards the stage, but are helped there by management. The video ends with Busted running up a ramp onto the stage.

Track listings

UK CD1 and cassette single
 "Who's David" (single version)
 "Teenage Kicks"

UK CD2
 "Who's David" (single version)
 "Where Is the Love?"
 "Fall at Your Feet"
 "Who's David" (video)

Japanese CD single
 "Who's David"
 "Where Is the Love?"
 "Fall at Your Feet"
 "Teenage Kicks"
 "Who's David" (video)

Personnel
Personnel are taken from the A Present for Everyone album booklet.
 James Bourne – writing
 Tom Fletcher – writing
 Steve Power – production, mixing, programming
 Dan Porter – assistant recording engineer

Charts

Weekly charts

Year-end charts

References

2003 songs
2004 singles
Busted (band) songs
Island Records singles
Song recordings produced by Steve Power
Songs written by James Bourne
Songs written by Tom Fletcher
Universal Records singles